Walnut Hills is a neighborhood in Cincinnati, Ohio, United States.  One of the city’s oldest hilltop neighborhoods, it is a large diverse area on the near east side of Cincinnati.  Eden Park is the gateway to Walnut Hills when driving north from downtown, and the University of Cincinnati is less than 10 minutes away. The neighborhood is redeveloping, restoring many of its buildings and introducing new businesses to the area. The population was 6,344 in the 2020 Census.

Demographics

Source - City of Cincinnati Statistical Database

History
The neighborhood was named from the farm of an early settler, Reverend James Kemper, which he called Walnut Hill.  For generations, the Kemper family lived in the Kemper Log House. Walnut Hills was annexed to the City of Cincinnati in September, 1869.

After the turn of the century, new migrants from Cincinnati’s downtown basin moved to the area. Like South Avondale, Walnut Hills was home to many Jewish and Italian families. An area on the western side of McMillan St. was known as “Little Italy.” After construction of the Union Terminal, and other public housing projects demolished housing in the West End, many African Americans moved to the area in the 1930s. When modern suburbs were created after World War II, many of community's middle class white residents moved out of Walnut Hills. Similarly, middle class African Americans moved from the area after less affluent residents moved to the area. Almost 80% of Walnut Hills was populated by African Americans by 1970.

Architecture and historic landmarks
In addition to Walnut Hill’s Victorian homes, it has many architectural treasures and historical sites. The Harriet Beecher Stowe House (now an Ohio State Historical site with highlights of the abolitionist movement and the African American struggle for justice) was where Harriet Beecher Stowe and her family lived, as well as the site where she researched Uncle Tom's Cabin.

The Walnut Hills Library, Cincinnati's first Carnegie Library, and the Walnut Hills United Presbyterian Church's remaining tower at Taft and Gilbert were designed by famed architect Samuel Hannaford.

The commercial district at Peebles' Corner, originally called Kemper's Corner, was once the busiest district outside Downtown Cincinnati, with six street cars lines intersecting at McMillan and Gilbert by the end of the 19th century.

The first Walnut Hills High School, (now Schoolhouse Loft LP), was located on 2700 Ashland Avenue.

Historic districts in Walnut Hills
Walnut Hills buildings are of historic architecture in a range of styles. Several historic districts in Walnut Hills have been listed on the National Register.
Gilbert-Sinton Historic District
Gilbert Row
Madison and Woodburn Historic District
Peeble's Corner Historic District

See also
East Walnut Hills

References

 
Neighborhoods in Cincinnati